The 2015 Balkan Athletics Championships was the 74th edition of the annual track and field competition for athletes from the Balkans, organised by Balkan Athletics. It was held at Stadionul Nicolae Dobrin in Pitești, Romania on 1 and 2 August. The host nation Romania won the most medals at the competition, with 28, and the Turkey won the most gold medals, at 10. The competition was originally scheduled to take place in Serres, Greece, but the venue was changed due to a lack of funding, in the context of the Greek government-debt crisis.

On the men's side, three championship records were broken. Jak Ali Harvey of Turkey ran a record of 10.11 seconds to win the 100 metres, Slovenia's Robert Renner cleared 5.65 m to win the pole vault in a Slovenian record, and Andrei Gag set a championship and Romanian record of 20.96 m to win the shot put. The highlight performance of the women's competition was a championship record of 9:33.41 minutes by Silvia Danekova in the 3000 metres steeplechase, which was also a Bulgarian national record.

Results

Men

Women

 Israel's Maayan Furman-Shahaf cleared 1.87 m in the women's high jump but was not included in the medals tally as her country was not a member of Balkan Athletics.

Medal table

References

Results
74th Balkan Athletics Championships. Balkan Athletics. Retrieved 2019-08-03.

2015
Sport in Pitești
International athletics competitions hosted by Romania
Balkan Athletics Championships
Balkan Athletics Championships
Balkan Athletics Championships